The  is a limited express electric multiple unit (EMU) train type operated by Kintetsu Railway in Japan since 1996.

Two 2-car sets were introduced in 1996, and both are operated on the Minami Osaka and Yoshino Lines, replacing the earlier  trains. Only four cars were built as focus had shifted to the newer 16600 series sets.

The design is based on the Kintetsu 22000 series trains used on the standard gauge Osaka and Nara Lines since 1992. The 22000 series and 16400 series are practically identical, with the exception that the 16400 series are used on narrow gauge lines and that the 16400 series were built with Hitachi IGBT variable-frequency drives from new.

Formations
The two two-car sets are formed as shown below.

The Mo 16400 car is fitted with two lozenge-stype pantographs.

Refurbishment
Both sets were refurbished in 2015. Improvements include new seat upholstery similar to those used on the refurbished 26000 series cars, new LED headlights and refurbishment of the in-car toilets. The first set to be refurbished, set 16401, returned to service on 25 March 2015. The second set, 16402, returned to service on 9 September 2015.

References

External links

 Kintetsu website 
 Kintetsu Train information 

Electric multiple units of Japan
16400 series
Train-related introductions in 1996

ja:近鉄22000系電車#16400系
1500 V DC multiple units of Japan
Kinki Sharyo multiple units